

Numbering plan
The country's country calling code is +966. Saudi Arabia's numbering plan is the following:

011 XXX XXXX - Riyadh & the greater central region
012 XXX XXXX - Western region, includes Makkah, Jeddah, Taif, Rabigh
013 XXX XXXX- The Eastern Province, which includes, Dammam, Khobar, Qatif, Jubail, Dhahran, Hafar al-Batin & others
014 XXX XXXX - Al-Madinah, Tabuk, Al-Jawf, Yanbu, Turaif, Skaka and Northern Borders Region
016 XXX XXXX - Al-Qassim, Majma & Hail
017 XXX XXXX - Southern regions like Asir, Al-Baha, Jizan, Najran & Khamis Mushait
0811 1XX XXXX - GO (nomadic)
050/053/055 XXX XXXX - Saudi Telecom Company
051 XXX XXXX - Salam Mobile(previously occupied by bravO! Telecom)
058/059 XXX XXXX  - Zain Group
054/056 XXX XXXX - Mobily
0570/0571/0572 XX XXXX Virgin Mobile
0575 XX XXXX Redbull Mobile
0576/0577/0578 XXXXXX Lebara Mobile

Internet services
36009213914195- Internet Services - Dial-up366 XXXX - Internet Services - Dial-up
 08 111 XXXXXX - Atheeb GO Telecom phone numbers

Toll-free and universal access800XXX XXXX - Toll free9200 XXXXX - Universal Access Number (prefixes 9200 to 9209)

Services and emergency959 - Mobile Customer Service Center (Zain)600 - Mobile Customer Service Center (Bravo Telecom)1100 - Mobile Customer Service Center (Mobily)1789 - Mobile Customer Service Center (Virgin Mobile)1755 - Mobile Customer Service Center (Lebara Mobile)900 - Telephone Customer Service Center (STC) (They were separated before, 907 for Landline, 902 for Mobile, but since September 2015, they are merged)933 - Saudi Electricity Customer Services937 - Saudi Ministry of Health Services939 - Saudi Water and Sewage Services (Eastern Region)940 - Saudi Municipal Services966 - Saudi Natural Disasters985 - Saudi General Intelligence Presidency989 - Saudi Public Security990 - Saudi Telephone Service for Security Issues992 - Saudi Passport993 - Saudi Traffic Police Force994 - Saudi Border Checkpoint995 - Saudi Anti-Narcotics996 - Saudi Highway Traffic Police Force997 - Saudi Red Crescent998 - Saudi Civil Defense999 - Saudi Police Force911''' - Saudi Unified Emergency Number (Under testing since July 2016 in Makkah Region & Riyadh Region)

References

ITU allocations list

Saudi Arabia
Telecommunications in Saudi Arabia
Telephone numbers